Maj Gen Koos Laubscher  was a General Officer in the South African Army from the artillery.

Military career 

He joined the South African Defence Force in 1964. He was a graduate of the South African Military Academy and the prestigious South African Long Gunnery Course Number 3 as a top student during 1972 and was awarded the crossed-barrels status in the same year. He passed the Army College and the Defence College courses. He saw action in Angola during Savannah in 1975-76 and throughout the South African Border War including the operational debut of the G5 155mm towed gun/howitzer in the Angolan theatre of war during the eighties. Chief Instructor Gunnery at School of Artillery from 1975. He was an officer instructor at the South African Army College and the Army Battle School, OC 4 Artillery Regiment from 1981 to 1982, OC School of Artillery and later Director of Artillery from 1987 to 1991, Commandant of the Army College in 1993. He served as GOC 7 Division from 1996 to 1998. GOC Army Support Formation from 1999 to 2005. He retired from SANDF in 2005.

Honours and awards

Medals 
  with Bar

Proficiency badges

References 

South African Army generals
South African military officers
Possibly living people
1945 births
Afrikaner people
South African people of Dutch descent
Stellenbosch University alumni
South African military personnel of the Border War